Vila Nova Basquete Clube is a Brazilian men's professional basketball club that is based in Goiânia, Goiás, Brazil. It is a part of the multi-sports club Vila Nova Esporte Clube.

History
Vila Nova won the Brazilian Championship title in 1973. They also competed at the 1974 edition of the FIBA Intercontinental Cup.

Honors and titles

National
 Brazilian Championship
 Champions (1): 1973
 Runners-up (1): 1974

Notable players

  Washington "Dodi" Joseph
  Marquinhos Leite
  Adilson Nascimento

Head coaches
 Togo "Kanela" Renan Soares

References

External links
Official website 
Twitter 

Basketball teams in Brazil

pt:Vila Nova Futebol Clube#Basquete